Alston & Bird LLP is an international law firm with over 800 lawyers in 13 offices throughout the United States, Europe, the UK, and Asia. The firm provides legal services to both domestic and international clients who conduct business worldwide. Alston & Bird has advised companies including Amazon.com, The Coca-Cola Company, Microsoft, Bank of America, Starbucks, Toyota, Dell, UPS, and Nokia. Since 2000, Fortune has ranked the firm in the 100 Best Companies to Work For list. The firm's core practices include intellectual property, complex litigation, corporate and tax, with national industry focusing on energy and sustainability, health care, financial services, and public policy.

History
Through the roots of the Alston, Miller & Gaines’ predecessor firms, the merger with Jones, Bird and Howell formed Alston & Bird on December 1, 1982. Expansion beyond Georgia began with the establishment of an office in Washington, D.C., followed by the 1997 merger with intellectual property-focused Bell Seltzer Park & Gibson (Charlotte and Raleigh), Walter, Conston, Alexander & Green in 2001 (New York), and Crews, Shepherd & McCarty LLP in 2007 (Dallas).

In August 2008, the firm opened a Silicon Valley office with attorneys from the national firm Akin Gump Strauss Hauer & Feld. The next month, Alston & Bird acquired Weston Benshoof Rochefort Rubalcava and MacCuish LLP (which had a total of ~100 lawyers), launching in Los Angeles and Ventura County to reach nine offices nationwide.  In March 2017, the firm opened its San Francisco office. In September 2019, the firm opened their London office.
 
Today, the firm is headquartered in Midtown Atlanta in One Atlantic Center.

In February 2020, the Consumer Financial Protection Bureau Deputy Director, Brian Johnson, left the agency to become a partner at Alston & Bird LLP.

Offices 
The firm has offices in Atlanta, New York City, Washington, D.C., Brussels, Charlotte, Raleigh, Dallas, Fort Worth, London, Los Angeles, Beijing, San Francisco, and Silicon Valley.

Compensation 
In June 2016, Alston & Bird announced that it would raise attorney salaries to match market rates set earlier that month by the New York–based law firm Cravath, Swaine & Moore. Firm bonuses range from $15,000 to $100,000, depending on service years and merit-based reviews.

Political contributions
According to OpenSecrets, Alston & Bird was one of the top law firms contributing to federal candidates during the 2012 election cycle, donating $1.26 million, 53% to Democrats. Since 1990, Alston & Bird contributed $5.1 million to federal campaigns.

The New York Times reported that a $1 million contribution was made through Alston & Bird to Project Veritas in 2019.

Notable cases
Counsel to German media group Bertelsmann AG (a longtime client of legacy firm Walter, Conston) with Clifford Chance and Slaughter & May as UK co-counsel in Bertelsmann's $2.74 billion acquisition of Zomba Music Group in 2002.
Represented Cingular Wireless in its purchase of 34 wireless licenses from NextWave Media in 2003.
Advised Regions Financial Corporation alongside Sullivan & Cromwell in its purchase of Union Planters Corporation in 2004, a transaction valued at $5.8 billion.
Advised longstanding client IndyMac, its executives and directors the FBI investigation into the California bank's collapse in 2008. Alston also advised the bank on the transfer of its assets to government control under the auspices of the Federal Deposit Insurance Corporation.
Represented Toyota in the economic loss class actions arising from the 2009–2010 Toyota vehicle recalls.

Notable attorneys 
Keith R. Blackwell, former justice of the Georgia Supreme Court and judge of the Georgia Court of Appeals
Jody Hunt, former assistant attorney general for the U.S. Department of Justice Civil Division from 2018 to 2020, and chief of staff to the United States attorney general from 2017 to 2018
B.J. Pak, former United States Attorney for the Northern District of Georgia from 2017 to 2021 and member of the Georgia House of Representatives from 2011 to 2017

Notable alumni
Philip H. Alston, Jr., U.S. Ambassador to Australia and to Nauru, confidant of former U.S. President Jimmy Carter, and founder of Alston & Bird  
Chaz Beasley, member of the North Carolina House of Representatives
Sean Bedford,  former American football center for the Georgia Tech Yellow Jackets
 Lonnie T. Brown, Jr., Dean of University of Tennessee law school.
Michael Lawrence Brown, United States district judge of the United States District Court for the Northern District of Georgia
Craig Carpenito, current United States Attorney for the District of New Jersey
Christopher M. Carr, Attorney General of Georgia
Tom Daschle, United States senator from South Dakota from 1987 to 2005.
Bob Dole, former member of the U.S. House of Representatives and U.S. Senate from Kansas
Daisy Hurst Floyd, former dean of Walter F. George School of Law of Mercer University
Keith Gottfried, 19th General Counsel for the United States Department of Housing and Urban Development
Bobby Jones, winner of the 1930 Grand Slam, founder of the Masters Tournament and Augusta National Golf Club, former Alston & Bird partner, as well as founding partner of one of Alston & Bird's predecessor firms (Jones, Bird, and Howell); the firm continues to represent the Bobby Jones brand and monitors trademark issues for the family
Blanche Lincoln, former U.S. Senator from Arkansas
Karol Mason, Assistant Attorney General under the Obama administration
Robert McCallum Jr., former Associate Attorney General of the United States and former United States Deputy Attorney General
Earl Pomeroy, former U.S. Representative for North Dakota's at-large congressional district
Tom Scully, former senior official in the administrations of Presidents George H. W. Bush and George W. Bush
Leah Ward Sears, former Chief Justice of the Supreme Court of Georgia
Francis Shackelford, former General Counsel of the Army
Frank E. Sheeder III, former President of the Health Care Compliance Association (HCCA)
Peter Swire, Professor of Law at Scheller College of Business at the Georgia Institute of Technology
Anne Tompkins, former United States Attorney for the United States District Court for the Western District of North Carolina
Thomas Walker, former United States Attorney for the Eastern District of North Carolina
Joe Whitley, the first General Counsel for the United States Department of Homeland Security
Todd Zywicki, Professor of Law at George Mason University School of Law

See also
Timeline of investigations into Trump and Russia (2019)
White shoe firms
The Magic Circle
List of law firms

References

External links
Official website

Law firms established in 1893
Law firms based in Atlanta
1893 establishments in Georgia (U.S. state)